Tim Curry (born 1946), is an English actor and singer.

Tim Curry may also refer to:

Tim Curry (attorney) (1938–2009), American attorney
Tim Curry (guitarist), former member of The Crüxshadows

See also
Tim Curran (disambiguation)
Tom Curry (disambiguation)